Forever the Sickest Kids (sometimes abbreviated as FTSK) is an American pop punk band from Dallas, Texas. The band first signed with Universal Motown Records and released its debut album, Underdog Alma Mater, on April 29, 2008. The band's second album, Forever the Sickest Kids, was released on March 1, 2011. Universal Motown Records was later shut down in 2011 and the band was left unsigned for over a year until signing to Fearless Records in late 2012. The band released its third studio album, J.A.C.K., on June 25, 2013. In an Alternative Press article, the band was placed number one underground band of the "22 Best Underground Bands".

History

Early projects and formation (2001–2006)
In 2001–2004, the members of Forever the Sickest Kids were slowly brought together from separate paths. From Burleson, Texas, Jonathan Cook and Kyle Burns were in a band together in high school, Good Day Josif. About the same time in Hurst, Texas, Marc Stewart and Kent Garrison were in a band together called Triumph Over Tragedy, with friends from their high school. In Rockwall, Texas, Turman and Bello were in an acoustic pop band, Committed.

The three bands all played local clubs around Dallas/Fort Worth, and on occasion, at the same events and concerts. Burns and Stewart are step-brothers, resulting in Good Day Josif and Triumph Over Tragedy sharing a practice space in their parents' garage.

In 2004, upon the break up of Good Day Josif and Triumph over Tragedy, Cook, Stewart and Burns formed the band the Flipside, along with their friend Chris Hill. Soon after, Craig Calloway (from Triumph over Tragedy) was added to the Flipside's lineup, and Garrison soon replaced Chris Hill on bass guitar. The band went on to play at numerous local shows and released an independent eponymous EP.

Around the same time, Committed broke up, and childhood friends Austin Bello and Caleb Turman formed an acoustic/electronic project called Been Bradley. Although they never released any official albums or EPs, many of the band's songs were released online through the group's MySpace profile, such as "All for Angela" and "X Me Out."

When both bands, the Flipside and Committed, eventually ended, Cook and Stewart came into contact with Bello and Turman, and it was suggested that the remaining members from both bands could form in a new band. Their new band, Forever the Sickest Kids, was formed. Cook remained on vocals, Turman took on rhythm guitar and vocals, Bello was on bass guitar and vocals, Stewart was on lead guitar, Burns was on drums, and Garrison switched to keyboard. Calloway (of the Flipside) did not take part in the band, but would later be a part of the band Artist vs. Poet as a guitarist.

Label signing and Underdog Alma Mater (late 2006–2009)
Days after the formation of Forever the Sickest Kids, Cook accidentally spent $350 that the band did not have on PureVolume to receive a front-page placement of a song. The band also did not have any songs written yet. The band then quickly contacted producer Geoff Rockwell and managed to write the song "Hey Brittany" and have it recorded in a studio. The song was a success and received many plays and views on the Internet. The band landed a record deal with Universal Motown Records in April 2007. The band released its first EP, Television Off, Party On, with the label on July 3. Two more EPs, The Sickest Warped Tour EP and Hot Party Jamz followed, months afterward. They appeared on that year's Warped Tour.

On April 1, 2008, the band released its first single, "Whoa Oh! (Me vs. Everyone)", soon followed by a music video. The song would later be re-released as "Whoa Oh!", a duet version featuring Selena Gomez. It was then announced that the band's debut album, Underdog Alma Mater, would be released on April 29. The album sold well and was soon followed by the album's second single, "She's a Lady", which was released on July 14. The music video for "She's a Lady" was released shortly afterward. During this time, the band also covered "Men in Black" by Will Smith for the compilation album Punk Goes Crunk.

The band went on the 2008 Alternative Press tour from March 14 to May 2, played on its first headlining tour, and later performed on the 2008 Vans Warped Tour. The band appeared on Late Night with Conan O'Brien on June 12, performing "Whoa Oh! (Me vs. Everyone)". The band then headed to Tokyo, Japan to perform at the annual Summer Sonic Festival. In late September, the band undertook a brief headlining tour in the UK, after Cobra Starship, the original headlining act, postponed its tour. The band played at the 2009 Vans Warped Tour from July 22 to August 26.

In June, it was announced that Underdog Alma Mater would be re-released as a deluxe edition album. The deluxe edition of the album featured the original twelve songs from Underdog Alma Mater, seventeen additional tracks that were mainly demos and acoustics from the band's old days, and a DVD that included recorded live shows of the band and music videos. The deluxe edition was released on July 7, 2009.

The Weekend: Friday (mid-2009–2010)
On October 30, the band released a new single, "What Do You Want from Me". It was announced that the band would be releasing a new EP entitled The Weekend: Friday on November 17, including "What Do You Want from Me". On November 12, the entire EP was streamed on the band's MySpace profile. A music video for "What Do You Want from Me" was released in late December.

On December 9, the band was announced to be the supporting act for British band You Me at Six on their UK tour from March 2 to March 28, 2010.

On January 25, 2010, the band was featured on an episode of the MTV series Silent Library. In February, the compilation album Punk Goes Classic Rock was released, with the band covering "Crazy Train" by Ozzy Osbourne. In March, a version of "What Do You Want from Me" with slight editing of the lyrics was used in the ending credits of the film Diary of a Wimpy Kid.

The band then released two prequel videos to its single and music video "She Likes (Bittersweet Love)" on its YouTube account in April. The official full music video was released on April 19. As soon as it was released, it was selected as Kerrang!s video of the week. The band then supported The Downtown Fiction, All Time Low, Boys Like Girls, Third Eye Blind, and LMFAO on The Bamboozle Roadshow 2010. Other supporting acts with the band included 3OH!3, Good Charlotte, Cartel, and Simple Plan.

Self-titled album, departure of Garrison and Stewart, and label closure (2010–2011) 

On September 14, 2010, the band released a new song called "Keep On Bringing Me Down" on YouTube. It was announced that this would be the lead single from The Weekend: Saturday, which was planned to be the continuation from the group's previous EP, The Weekend: Friday. The band then went on "The Summer Camp for the Dope Awesome Kids Tour", which featured The Scene Aesthetic, The Ready Set, A Cursive Memory and Phone Calls from Home.

On November 25, Cook revealed through his Tumblr account that the band would not be releasing The Weekend: Saturday, but instead a self-titled album. The band explained this decision was made because as they had gone into the studio with producer David Bendeth, they continued to quickly write more than five songs for the EP and decided to release a full-length album instead. While touring, the band began to play a new track from the new album, called "Life of the Party". On November 8, the band leaked the track "I Guess You Can Say Things Are Getting Pretty Serious" on Stickam.

On January 10, 2011, two months before the release of the self-titled album, Garrison posted on his blog that he was leaving the band, stating that he wanted to "pursue other opportunities." A month later, on February 11, the band released a video of them playing an instrumental version of the track "What Happened to Emotion? (Killing Me)". Three days later, the band released a video of them discussing the new album while a new track, "Forever Girl" was played.

On March 1, the self-titled album, Forever the Sickest Kids, was released.

A month later, the band set out on the headlining "Spring Break Your Heart" tour with Breathe Carolina, We Are the In Crowd, This Century, Tonight Alive and Before Their Eyes. In June, the band released "I Guess You Can Say Things Are Getting Pretty Serious" as the album's second single, along with a music video which was self-produced by the band. A month later, "Summer Song" was released as the third single, followed by another self-produced music video.

On September 22, Stewart announced on his Twitter account that he was leaving the band. The band had later confirmed his departure via Twitter, stating, "Some may already know @marcFTSK is now married we wish him the best of luck & thank him for 4yrs of hard work & memories!". The band's crew member, Rico Andradi, became a touring member with the band to play lead guitar in Stewart's spot. The band later commented on both Garrison's and Stewart's departures, stating that both had left on great terms and wanted to go back to college, due to never finishing because of the formation of the band.

Due to the separation of Motown Records from Universal Motown Records and Universal Motown Republic Group and because of the cancellations with Universal Motown, the band was left unsigned.

The band released a lyric video of a new song, "Shut the Front Door (Too Young for This)", via YouTube on October 28, soon followed by a music video. Later on December 2, the band released a video for its first Christmas song, "Mistletoe is for Quitters".

New label, J.A.C.K., and hiatus (2012–2016)
On February 16, 2012 Ayala Malls sponsored an event called LIV5, where the band performed with The Ready Set, The Summer Set, and A Rocket to the Moon in the Philippines. The band later headed to Australia to perform at the Soundwave festival alongside bands such as Angels and Airwaves and System of a Down.

On September 10, it was announced that the band had signed to Fearless Records.

The band contributed to the compilation album Punk Goes Pop 5, covering "We Found Love" by Rihanna. For the first time in the group's music, a short breakdown was included, which consisted of Bello screaming during his verse. In an interview with Burns over the song and covering for the Punk Goes... series, he stated, "It's a time for us to get crazy without being worried about stepping out of our comfort zones, because they aren't our songs... So we thought it would be fun to mix it up a bit." The band then performed the theme song "We Are the Guardians", for the Nicktoons show NFL Rush Zone: Guardians of the Core.

On January 29, 2013, the band posted on its Twitter account that Mike Green was the band's producer for its third album. The band then performed at the NFL Play 60 Kids' Day Experience in New Orleans at the Ernest N. Morial Convention Center, ahead of the Super Bowl XLVII. On February 21, in an interview with idobi Radio, Cook revealed that the album would consist of twelve songs and would be released on June 25, stating, "If I could describe this record in one word, I would say we made a rock album... It's right back to what everyone loves from Underdog Alma Mater days." He also revealed the title of a track, "Chin Up Kid".

Alternative Press later held an interview with Cook, in which he said that the band wrote forty-six songs during the production of the album. He also revealed the titles of two more songs included on the album, "My Friends Save Me", an acoustic song, and "Nikki", which was co-written by frontman Patrick Stump of Fall Out Boy. On April 25, a preview of "Chin Up Kid" was released and the album's cover art and track listing were revealed, with its title confirmed as J.A.C.K. "Chin Up Kid" was later officially released as a digital download on May 7. On May 24, Billboard streamed the song "Nice to Meet You", with its official release date on May 28. Pre-order bundles for the album were also released on May 28, which included limited copies of the album on 12" vinyl. On June 21, the band streamed J.A.C.K. on its Facebook page. One day before the album's release, the band posted lyric videos for each song from the album.

The band performed on Warped Tour 2013, which started on June 15 and ended on August 4.

Since the end of Warped Tour, little was heard from the band until March 17, 2014, when an interview with Turman surfaced, with him stating that he was unsure of the band's status and was moving on to focus on his own music. However, on the same day, the band announced on its Twitter account that it was not breaking up and that no one was leaving the band. Turman and Andradi formed a band called TEAM*, along with Jay Vilardi of The Almost, and Bryan Donahue, formerly of Boys Like Girls. The following day, Bello and Burns released their own song, entitled "Cool", featuring Dusty Goode.

After nearly a year and a half without any updates of the band's status, on August 20, 2015, the band posted on its Facebook page that the band members were "very much alive and well" and they had been taking the time to focus on their personal lives.

Reunion and continued hiatus (2017–present)
Earlier in November 2016, it was announced the band was planning to perform again. The band returned to the stage and performed at the So What?! Music Festival in Grand Prairie, Texas from March 24 to March 26, 2017. Their performance was well received and marked the first time they had played together since late 2013.

In an interview with Highlight Magazine, Cook revealed the band has no plans to release new music or to hold any performances in the near future. However, he said if the timing is right the band will perform again, "even if it's just for one, fun show." As stated in the article, "The band isn't defunct, but dormant. The band [is] on pause until opportunity and availability align again." Cook concluded, "Keep following us on Facebook. That's where the updates will be."

On April 29, 2018, the band celebrated the 10 year anniversary of Underdog Alma Mater by releasing limited vinyl editions of the album.

On December 25, 2018, the band announced on Twitter that they have an upcoming event in 2019 after their hiatus. On March 17, 2019, the band announced the end of their hiatus and performed in July in Texas as part of the Sad Summer Festival. As of 2022, the band has not released any new music or toured, making the future of the band uncertain.

Musical style and influences
Forever the Sickest Kids' main genres consist of pop punk, pop rock, emo pop and power pop. Many of the band's songs feature synthesizers and have dance and electronic based influences, along with the piano and keyboard often being included. Acoustic and hip hop have also been utilized in the group's music. The band mainly has positive, upbeat sounds in its songs, which are typically structured with pop based hooks, both electronic and regular drum beats, and catchy guitar riffs that still maintain rock and punk elements to the music. A primary example that displays the band's structure, sound, and vocal arrangement is the song "I Don't Know About You, But I Came to Dance", found on the band's first release, Television Off, Party On.

Before his departure, Stewart stated, "Ultimately, when you hear the music, we want it to make you want to dance in your car while you're driving. We want it to be easy to sing along to but so catchy you don't wanna stop."

In nearly every song by the band, Cook, Bello, and Turman share lead vocals. Cook usually sings the chorus of the song, while Bello and Turman take on the verses, although it is not limited to this routine. Cook generally sings with a powerful, screeching voice and frequently ranges from a low to high pitch. Bello's vocals are similar to Cook's; however, Bello usually sings with a higher pitch and has a more distinct voice. Turman is known for taking the lead in the band's acoustic songs, such as "Coffee Break" and "Forever Girl", due to having a much softer voice than Cook and Bello. He also sang prominently in "What Happened to Emotion? (Killing Me)", with Cook and Bello only singing the bridge of the song.

Blink-182, Fall Out Boy, Weezer, Bowling for Soup, New Found Glory, and Fountains of Wayne have served as some of the main influences for the band.

Band members

Current members
Jonathan Cook – co-lead vocals (2006–present), piano, keyboards, synthesizer (2011–present)
Austin Bello – bass, co-lead vocals  (2006–present)
Caleb Turman – lead guitar (2011–present), rhythm guitar, co-lead vocals (2006–present)
Kyle Burns – drums, percussion (2006–present)

Touring musicians
Rico Andradi – rhythm guitar, lead guitar (2011–present)

Former members
Marc Stewart – lead guitar (2006–2011)
Kent Garrison – keyboards, synthesizers, piano (2006–2011)

Timeline

Discography

Studio albums
 Underdog Alma Mater (2008)
 Forever the Sickest Kids (2011)
 J.A.C.K. (2013)

References

External links

American power pop groups
American pop rock music groups
Pop punk groups from Texas
Musical groups from Dallas
Fearless Records artists
Motown artists
Musical groups established in 2006
Musical groups disestablished in 2013
Musical groups reestablished in 2019
Universal Motown Records artists
American electronic rock musical groups